Stjepan Razum is a Croatian church historian and Roman Catholic priest. He is the  director of the Archdiocesan Archives in Zagreb and a member of the Commission for the Croat martyrology of the Episcopal Conference of Bosnia and Herzegovina and Episcopal Conference of Croatia; mainly researching on the Catholic priests and nuns killed and persecuted by Yugoslav communists.

Razum is also the president of Society for Research of the Threefold Jasenovac Camp ("Društvo za istraživanje trostrukog logora Jasenovac"); he and the secretary of that society  popular historian Igor Vukić were both publicly denounced as Holocaust deniers.

In 2018, Razum published a Facebook post expressing support for Richard Williamson, a member of a fringe Catholic breakaway movement who was convicted of Holocaust denial in Germany.

In January 2019, Razum and Croatian mathematician Josip Pečarić published a book titled Razotkrivena jasenovačka laž ("The Jasenovac Lie Revealed"), which denies that the Ustaše operated an extermination camp at Jasenovac, arguing instead that it was a forced labor camp.

References

External links
 List of books, scientific papers and other articles by Stjepan Razum
 "Relativisation of the Ustasha crimes violates the fundamental values of the Constitution, with a lack of reaction opening room to hatred", Ombudsman of the Republic of Croatia, 20 November 2018

Living people
Catholicism and politics
21st-century Croatian historians
Catholicism-related controversies
Croatian Holocaust deniers
21st-century Croatian Roman Catholic priests
Deniers of the genocide of Serbs in the Independent State of Croatia
Year of birth missing (living people)